Thor Anders Myhren (born 8 March 1978), better known as Destructhor, is a Norwegian musician and composer, currently the vocalist and guitarist for metal band Myrkskog and guitarist for black metal band Nordjevel. He is also the former guitarist for bands Morbid Angel and Zyklon. He joined Morbid Angel in 2008 and departed in 2015. He has worked as a live guitarist with 1349 including Inferno festival in 2008 and 2015. Most Recently, he plays with  black/death metal project Nader Sadek in live settings, and has recorded solos for the project for their debut " In the flesh"

Discography

Myrkskog
 Deathmachine (2000, Candlelight Records)
 Superior Massacre (2002, Candlelight Records)

Zyklon
 World ov Worms (2001, Candlelight Records)
 Aeon (2003, Candlelight Records)
 Disintegrate (2006, Candlelight Records)
 Storm Detonation Live  (2006, DVD, Candlelight Records)

Morbid Angel 
 Illud Divinum Insanus (2011, Season of Mist)

Nordjevel 
  Necrogenesis (2019, Osmose Productions)

References

1978 births
Living people
Norwegian heavy metal musicians
Morbid Angel members